Icterus may refer to:
Jaundice
Icterus (bird), a genus of New World orioles